The Oswego River is a  tributary of the Wading River in the southern New Jersey Pine Barrens in the United States.

See also
List of rivers of New Jersey

References

External links
 U.S. Geological Survey: NJ stream gaging stations

Tributaries of the Mullica River
Rivers of New Jersey
Rivers in the Pine Barrens (New Jersey)
Rivers of Burlington County, New Jersey